Nicholas Wanostrocht (5 October 1804 – 3 September 1876), known as Nicholas Felix, was an English amateur "gentleman" cricketer. He was one of the few players who – at his request – was routinely known by his pseudonym, Felix. When his father died in 1824 he had inherited the running of his school, aged only nineteen, and he was afraid that the parents of pupils might think that cricket was too frivolous a pastime for a schoolmaster.

Felix was a specialist left-handed batsman, although he did occasionally bowl underarm slow left-arm orthodox. He was a mainstay of the great Kent team of the mid-19th century alongside such players as Alfred Mynn, Fuller Pilch, William Hillyer and Ned Wenman. In the words of the famous elegy, best loved of Bernard Darwin,

And with five such mighty cricketers 'twas but natural to win
As Felix, Wenman, Hillyer, Fuller Pilch and Alfred Mynn.

Felix played for Kent from 1830 until 1852.  He also appeared for MCC sides and was a member of William Clarke's All-England Eleven.

In his overall first-class career, Felix played in 149 matches and scored 4,556 runs with a highest score of 113. He played at a time when prevailing conditions greatly favoured bowlers and was rated very highly as a batsman by his contemporaries.

He was the author of a famous instruction book: Felix on the Bat published in 1845. He also invented the catapulta (a bowling machine) as well as India-rubber batting gloves. A man of many talents, he was also a classical scholar, musician, linguist, inventor, writer and artist.

Felix died at Wimborne Minster in Dorset and is buried in Wimborne cemetery.

References

 Scores & Biographies, Volume 1 by Arthur Haygarth
 Barclays' World of Cricket – 2nd Edition, 1980, Collins Publishers, p. 10.

External links 

 Felix on the Bat

English cricketers
Kent cricketers
Marylebone Cricket Club cricketers
All-England Eleven cricketers
Surrey cricketers
Gentlemen cricketers
North v South cricketers
English cricketers of 1826 to 1863
1804 births
1876 deaths
Cricket historians and writers
Surrey Club cricketers
Left-Handed v Right-Handed cricketers
Married v Single cricketers
Nicholas Felix's XI cricketers
Fast v Slow cricketers
Gentlemen of Kent cricketers